Tommaso Cassandro (born 9 January 2000) is an Italian professional footballer who plays as a defender for  club Lecce.

Club career

Bologna
Cassandro started playing for the under-19 squad of Bologna in the 2016–17 season. He did not get called up to the senior squad.

Loan to Novara
On 13 August 2019, Cassandro joined Serie C club Novara on loan.

He made his professional Serie C debut for Novara on 26 August 2019 in a game against Juventus U23, starting the game and playing the whole match.

Cittadella
On 29 August 2020, Cassandro joined Serie B club Cittadella on a permanent basis. Bologna retained a buy-back option that may be activated in the 2022–23 season.

Lecce
On 17 January 2023, Cassandro signed a three-year contract with Lecce.

References

External links
 

2000 births
Sportspeople from the Metropolitan City of Venice
People from Dolo
Footballers from Veneto
Living people
Italian footballers
Association football defenders
Bologna F.C. 1909 players
Novara F.C. players
A.S. Cittadella players
U.S. Lecce players
Serie C players
Serie B players